The World Cube Association (WCA) is the worldwide non-profit organization that regulates and holds competitions for mechanical puzzles that are operated by twisting groups of pieces, commonly known as  twisty puzzles (a subcategory of combination puzzles). The most famous of those puzzles is the Rubik's Cube. The WCA was founded by Ron van Bruchem of the Netherlands and Tyson Mao of the United States in 2004. The goal of the World Cube Association is to have "more competitions in more countries with more people and more fun, under fair conditions." In 2017, they started work to become a non-profit organization and on November 20, 2017, the state of California accepted the initial registration of the World Cube Association.

The organization is run by the board members. It assigns different teams and committees as well as delegates who can organize official competitions. The presence of a delegate is required to make the competition official. , more than 180,000 people from around the world have participated in WCA competitions and over 8,300 competitions have been held.

Board

Current board members

Former board members

Structure of the WCA

WCA Board of Directors
The WCA Board of Directors (or simply WCA Board) is the leadership team of the WCA and its highest authority. WCA Directors are Officers of the WCA and also, have the role of Full Delegate. The WCA Board is responsible for the WCA organization as a whole. As part of their day-to-day work, they discuss issues that affect the WCA and advise the committees. The WCA Board oversees that the applications to hold WCA Competitions meet fair conditions to give all the world similar chances to compete, and finally approves and announces the competitions accordingly. After competitions, they read reports from the WCA delegates about competitions to be up to date on the WCA activity worldwide and take part in the discussion of any incidents that occur.

The Board is also responsible for helping WCA fulfill its mission: “more competitions in more countries with more people and more fun, under fair and equal conditions.” This means spreading cubing to new communities and countries and working together with the Senior Delegates to open up cubing to even more people.

WCA Teams, Committees and Councils

WCA Communication Team
The WCA Communications Team (WCT) is in charge of overseeing and supporting the communications of the WCA with the community and the general public. This includes answering general requests that are submitted via the WCA website and maintaining the WCA's social media accounts. The team responds to multiple emails a day from all around the world regarding starting cubing competitions in new areas, what to do for your first competition, big media requests about competitive speedcubing, and many other issues. Many requests are also forwarded to the appropriate WCA Team or Delegate if they are regarding a particular competition or region.

WCA Competition Announcement Team
The WCA Competition Announcement Team (WCAT) is responsible for approving and announcing WCA Competitions and ensure such announcements adhere to WCA quality standards. They review and announce competition submissions to the WCA.

WCA Disciplinary Committee
The WCA Disciplinary Committee (WDC) investigates a variety of situations and proposes solutions including punishments when necessary. Among other topics, these situations could be serious violations of WCA regulations or community issues. They deal with many instances of cheating, general conduct, or disputes in the way that Delegates and organizers run events. They are also responsible for issues that may occur in the WCA internally.

They can be contacted by WCA officials or community members to be made aware of possible violations at WCA competitions. Initial contact with the team is usually through emails or directly from any competitor or Delegate. If the Team Leader agrees that this case falls under the WDC's jurisdiction, a WDC case is initiated. The team attempts to correspond with everyone involved, to get all sides of the story, and to provide an independent report for the investigation. Once the case is closed and the decision made, they inform all relevant persons of any actions and make a public announcement, if necessary.

WCA Ethics Committee
The WCA Ethics Committee (WEC) ensures that all the procedures followed by the WCA Staff and External Staff abide by its Code of Ethics, and to perform independent investigations if the conduct of any of these members is not compliant with the code. Such investigations can be requested by any Registered Speedcubers, for whom the WEC is a confidant. This committee also functions as the board of appeal if anyone involved disagrees with a decision made by the WCA Disciplinary Committee.

WCA Financial Committee
The WCA Financial Committee (WFC) is responsible for everything regarding finances within the WCA. As an Advisory Committee, they manage the finances and accounts of the WCA by an approved annual budget proposal, which is also their work to provide regularly. Similarly, the Financial Committee pays invoices and taxes that are directed to the WCA, after consultation and with permission of the WCA Board. Every quarter, they report and advise the WCA Board on all finances of the WCA, to give them a summary of the scope of financial possibilities and options that the WCA has. The leader of the WFC is the de facto Treasurer of the WCA.

WCA Marketing Team
The WCA Marketing Team (WMT) is responsible for managing WCA relationships with external partners as well as working closely with the WCA Brand. They are currently seeking help with WCA Merchandise, the WCA Gear Team, Sponsorships, & Contracts.

WCA Quality Assurance Committee
The WCA Quality Assurance Committee (WQAC) is responsible for supporting and promoting continuous quality improvement within the WCA, as well as worldwide application of quality standards to ensure consistent high quality of processes, WCA Staff, Regional Organizations, Competition Organizers, and Competition Staff.

WCA Regulations Committee
The WCA Regulations Committee (WRC) was founded to support the WCA Board in maintaining the WCA Regulations in 2011. Over the years, their area of responsibility has been broadened, so that they handle all issues which are related to the application, the improvement, and the development of the WCA Regulations today. They support Delegates on any kind of procedural matters happening at competitions and decide on unresolved and uncovered incidents. The WRC regularly publishes WCA internal reports to help all Delegates and improve their knowledge of the Regulations.
This includes regulation changes based on feedback from the WCA staff and the community, while also taking into account their insights and reports of incidents that occur during WCA competitions. New versions of the Regulations are published periodically. Another part of their work is to encourage members of the WCA community to create and maintain translations of the Regulations.

WCA Results Team
The WCA Results Team (WRT) is responsible for managing all data in the databases of the WCA, most importantly competition results and personal data.

The most time-consuming regular task of the WCA Results Team is posting results of WCA competitions to the WCA website, once the Delegate of the competition has sent them in. They rigorously check if the results were submitted correctly and if so, transfer them into the WCA results database. This work of the Results Team assures the data quality of the databases of the WCA. Each such posting procedure is ended by creating a public post on the WCA website – these are the posts that you can see on the front page of the WCA website!
Apart from posting competition results, the WCA Results Team is also responsible for making corrections to competition results if necessary and they are in charge of administering all WCA profile pages. This includes for example changing user data, like dates of birth, according to verified requests and managing profile picture requests.

WCA Software Team
The WCA website is a huge open source project on GitHub. They bring continuous improvements to the website very frequently, to allow all of the community members to easily access and enjoy WCA content. Recently internationalization was implemented, so now people can use the WCA website in their native language. Other important milestones are the development of the registration system, and especially payments. The team keeps an eye on the website all the time to ensure it is permanently available and they react as fast as possible whenever something is wrong.

The Software Team develops new software for various tasks within the WCA whenever needed. Thus, they created an app simplifying translating the website, to engage more people translating into their language. On 21 August 2012 the WCA Workbook assistant has released, which is used by all Delegates to submit the competition results to the WCA Results Team. The Software Team also updates the official WCA Scrambler, TNoodle, according to data provided by the WCA Regulations Committee if changes are needed. Additionally, they maintain and develop administrative tools for various Delegates, Committees, and board members on the WCA website.

WCA Advisory Council
The WCA Advisory Council (WAC) is responsible for building and maintaining bilateral communication between the WCA Community and the WCA Staff. It establishes communication channels between the WCA Community and the WCA Board, providing direct feedback from Registered Speedcubers about the WCA's operations. Members of the WAC include both staff and community members.

Current Teams, Committees and Councils Members 
Members are correct as of April 27, 2022.

WCA Delegates
WCA Delegates are members of the WCA who are responsible for making sure that all WCA competitions are run according to the mission, regulations, and spirit of the WCA. This means that a WCA Delegate needs to be present at every competition for it to be considered official. The WCA has four different types of delegates: WCA Senior Delegates, WCA Delegates, WCA Junior Delegates, and WCA Trainee Delegates. Beyond the duties of a WCA Delegate, a WCA Senior Delegate is responsible for managing the delegates in their area and should also be contacted by the community for regional matters. They are available to mentor the delegates in their area – especially when new communities are being developed. New delegates are listed as WCA Trainee Delegates at first and need to show their ability to manage competitions successfully before being listed as a WCA Junior Delegate. WCA Trainee Delegates will delegate their first competitions alongside more experienced delegates to get the hang of all responsibilities connected to delegate a WCA competition. WCA Junior Delegates can be promoted to a WCA Delegate after at least 1 year of successful work as a WCA Junior Delegate.

All acknowledged WCA Delegates, Junior Delegates and Senior Delegates can be found on their official Website.

History
In 1999, the first modern age speedcubers found each other on the Internet via Rubik's Games, a computer game with an electronic version of the Rubik's Cube. Chris Hardwick from Raleigh, NC founded the Yahoo! Group "Speedsolvingrubikscube" and the Unofficial World Records, a place where cubers could post their personal best times. Ron van Bruchem started speedcubing.com together with his friend Ton Dennenbroek, an avid puzzle collector.

Because the cubers were living all over the world, they wanted to organize a competition at which they could all meet. In 2003, under the guidance of Dan Gosbee, they organized the Rubik's Cube World Championship in Toronto. This first modern-age Rubik's Cube competition was a huge success, but there were many issues, largely due to the lack of any regulations. After the World Championship, van Bruchem and Tyson Mao started organizing competitions in the Netherlands and Germany, as well as at Caltech in the United States. In 2004, they started the World Cube Association, which today has held competitions in more than 100 countries.

Events
Currently, the WCA offers competitions in 17 events. Not all of them are offered at every competition, but they are usually all offered at national, continental, and global championships. The events are:
3x3x3 Cube
2x2x2 Cube
4x4x4 Cube
5x5x5 Cube
6x6x6 Cube
7x7x7 Cube
3x3x3 Blindfolded (3BLD)
3x3x3 Fewest Moves (FMC)
3x3x3 One-Handed (OH)
Megaminx
Pyraminx
Clock
Skewb
Square-1
4x4x4 Blindfolded (4BLD)
5x5x5 Blindfolded (5BLD)
3x3x3 Multi-Blind (MBLD)

Additionally, some events have had their official WCA event status removed. They are:
Magic
Master Magic
3x3x3 Multi-Blind Old Style
3x3x3 With Feet

Some events also formally held unofficial status at WCA events and no records were ever kept of them.
3x3x3 No Inspection
3x3x3 Speed Blindfolded
3x3x3 Three in a Row
3x3x3 Team Solve
3x3x3 Blindfolded Team Solve
2x2x2 Blindfolded
Clock Blindfolded
3x3x3 Siamese Cube
Rainbow Cube
Rubik's Snake
Mirror Blocks
Rubik's 360
2x2x2 One-Handed
Magic One-Handed
Face-turning Octahedron

World Championships 
Every two years starting from 2003, the WCA holds the Rubik's Cube World Championships. The Championship ultimately determines the world champion of the puzzle. Every official event is held at the Championship. The Rubik's Cube World Championship requires extremely careful planning by several volunteers, as well as a large financial commitment to reserve the venue and make necessary preparations. The latest championship was held in Melbourne, Australia from 11 to 14 July 2019. The 2021 World Championship was to be held in Almere, Amsterdam from 28 to 31 December 2021, already delayed from its initial July dates due to the COVID-19 pandemic, before being ultimately canceled by the association in August 2021. The next championship is to be held in Incheon, South Korea from 12 to 15 August 2023.

See also
Rubik's Cube
Speedcubing

Notes

External links
 

Rubik's Cube
Game associations